Trip is the second studio album by American singer Jhené Aiko. It was released on September 22, 2017, by ARTium and Def Jam Recordings. It succeeds Aiko's debut album Souled Out (2014), which was released three years prior, and the collaborative album Twenty88 (2016), while releasing numerous non-album singles in between. The production on the album was primarily handled by frequent collaborators Dot da Genius, Fisticuffs, No I.D. and Key Wane, along with several other record producers such as Amaire Johnson, Frank Dukes, Benny Blanco, Cashmere Cat and Mike Zombie. The album also includes guest appearances from Big Sean, Rae Sremmurd, Kurupt, Brandy, Mali Music, Aiko's father, with the moniker, Dr. Chill, Aiko's daughter, Namiko Love, and Chris Brown.

Trip was released without prior announcement, supported by the lead single "While We're Young". Other singles include "Hello Ego" featuring Chris Brown, "Sativa" featuring Rae Sremmurd, and "Never Call Me" featuring Kurupt. Trip received generally positive reviews from critics and was a moderate commercial success. The album debuted at number five on the US Billboard 200 chart, earning 32,000 album-equivalent units in its first week. It was also certified gold by the Recording Industry Association of America (RIAA) in November 2018.

Background
In September 2014, Aiko released her debut album, Souled Out, which was met with critical acclaim and commercial success. In 2016, Aiko collaborated with American rapper Big Sean for the 8-track album Twenty88 as a duo under the same name. Trip was originally announced in under the name TRIP 17, creating anticipation with non-album singles such as "Maniac", "First Fuck" with 6lack, and "Hello Ego" with Chris Brown between 2016 throughout early and mid-2017.

Describing the album's conception, Aiko stated that she wanted to create an album to showcase all of her personalities and express these. The album was inspired by different kinds of trips Aiko has experienced including mental, physical, and psychedelic.

Composition

Music and lyrics 
According to Pitchfork, Trip is a concept album that "aims to translate the hallucinogenic highs of weed, LSD, and shrooms into sound", with "Aiko’s voice [blending] well into the spare, psychedelia-inspired productions".

Promotion
A 23-minute autobiographical film titled after the album was released a day before Trip on September 21, 2017, co-directed by Aiko.

On October 11, 2017, Aiko announced a headlining North American concert tour in support of the album titled "Trip (The Tour)" with Willow Smith, Kitty Cash and Kodie Shane that will take place in November and December 2017, and a European leg was later announced. Aside from her own tour, Aiko toured with American singer-songwriter Lana Del Rey during January 2018 on the LA to the Moon Tour.

Singles
"While We're Young", premiered on June 8, 2017, along with its music video directed by Jay Ahn. It was released for digital download as the album's lead single on June 9.

The second single, a remix of "Sativa" featuring Rae Sremmurd, was released on January 22, 2018. It Peaked At Number 74 At The Billboard Hot 100.

Critical reception 

Trey Alston of HipHopDX believed the album to be "a moody yet breezy continuation of [Aiko's] established aesthetic that ultimately lacks growth of her musical capabilities". In a positive review of the album, Pitchfork explains "Trip works because it isn't just about self-medicating or journeying through a grief-ridden mind."

Commercial performance
Trip debuted at number five on the US Billboard 200 chart, earning 32,000 album-equivalent units (including 10,000 copies as pure album sales) in its first week. This became Aiko's fourth US top-ten debut. The album also accumulated a total of 37.8 million on-demand audio streams of the album's songs during the tracking week. On November 29, 2018, the album was certified gold by the Recording Industry Association of America (RIAA) for combined sales and album-equivalent units of over 500,000 units in the United States. In 2018, Trip was ranked as the 126th most popular album of the year on the Billboard 200.

Track listing
Credits adapted from Jhené Aiko's official website.

Notes
 signifies a co-producer
 signifies an additional producer

Personnel
Credits adapted from Tidal and Aiko's website.

Performance

 Jhené Aiko – primary artist
 Big Sean – featured artist 
 Twenty88 – featured artist 
 Swae Lee – featured artist 
 Kurupt – featured artist 
 Dr. Chill(Karamo chilombo,Jhene's father) – featured artist 
 Namiko Love(Jhené's daughter) – featured artist 
 Brandy – featured artist 
 Mali Music – featured artist 
 6LACK – vocals 
 Chris Brown – featured artist 

Instrumentation

 Doc Allison – cello 
 Chris Johnson – trombone 
 Sojung Lee – guitar 
 Jamelle Adisa – trumpet 
 Keith McKelley – tenor saxophone 
 Peter Lee Johnson – talk box 
 Felix Oquendo – saxophone 
 John Mayer – bass , guitar , electric guitar 
 David Meyers, Jr. – drums 
 Gracie Spout – harp 
 Amaire Johnson – ocarina 
 Bubby – bass 
 Martin Fredriksson – bass , percussion 
 Maxwell Karmazyn – strings 
 Nicholas Kennerly – strings 

Production

 Jhené Aiko – executive production, production , additional production 
 Taz – executive production
 Fisticuffs – co-executive production, production , co-production 
 Amaire Johnson – co-executive production, production , additional production 
 Dot da Genius – production , co-production 
 Noel Cadastre – production 
 Julian-Quan Viet Le – production 
 John Mayer – production 
 Benny Blanco – production 
 Cashmere Cat – production 
 Frank Dukes – production 
 Mike Zombie – production 
 Trakgirl – production 
 No I.D. – production 
 Julian-Quan Viet Le – production 
 KeY Wane – production 
 Mali Music – production 
 Mike Moore – additional production 
 Woodro Skillson – additional production 

Technical

 John Ralph Orlow – drum programming 
 Amaire Johnson – keyboards , additional keyboards 
 Julian-Quan Viet Le – additional keyboards 
 Brian Warfield – additional keyboards , recording engineering 
 Gregg Rominiecki – mixing 
 Jaycen Joshua – mixing 
 Dave Nakaji – mixing assistance 
 Iván Jiménez – mixing assistance 
 Fisticuffs – recording engineering , engineering 
 Jim Caruana – recording engineering 
 Christian Plata – recording engineering , additional mixing 
 Maximilian Jaeger – recording engineering  
 Casey Cuayo – recording engineering assistance 
 Jhené Aiko – recording arrangement 
 Big Sean – recording arrangement 
 Swae Lee – recording arrangement 
 Mali Music – recording arrangement 
 6lack – recording arrangement 
 Chris Brown – recording arrangement 
 Dave Kutch – mastering 

Management

 Jhené Aiko – A&R, styling
 TOCK – art direction, photography
 Veronica Ettman – package design
 Joe Spix – package design
 Chris Le – additional design
 Paul Lane – package production

Miscellaneous

 Olapido Omishore – author 
 Brian Warfield – author 
 Jhené Aiko – author 
 Maclean Robinson – author 
 Amaire Johnson – author 
 Big Sean – author 
 Swae Lee – author 
 Earnest Wilson – author 
 Frank Dukes – author 
 Julian-Quan Viet Le – author 
 KeY Wane – author 
 Mali Music – author 
 Chris Brown – author 

Notes
 "Clear My Mind" and "Hello Ego" from the Target exclusive version are listed as tracks 23 and 24, respectively

Charts

Weekly charts

Year-end charts

Certifications

References

2017 albums
Jhené Aiko albums
Albums produced by No I.D.
Albums produced by Benny Blanco
Albums produced by Cashmere Cat
Albums produced by Dot da Genius
Albums produced by Frank Dukes
Albums produced by Key Wane
Def Jam Recordings albums
Concept albums